Helen Giessler Grundman is an American mathematician.  She is the Director of Education and Diversity at the American Mathematical Society and Research Professor Emeritus of Mathematics at Bryn Mawr College.  Grundman is noted for her research in number theory and efforts to increase diversity in mathematics.

Education

Helen Grundman earned her PhD in 1989 from the University of California, Berkeley, under the supervision of P. Emery Thomas.

Employment

After receiving her PhD, Grundman spent two years as a C. L. E. Moore instructor at the Massachusetts Institute of Technology.  She became a professor at Bryn Mawr College in 1991.  In 2016, Grundman was named as the inaugural Director of Education and Diversity for the American Mathematical Society.

Research

In 1994, Grundman proved that sequences of more than 2n consecutive Harshad numbers in base n do not exist.

Honors

In 2017, Grundman was selected as a fellow of the Association for Women in Mathematics in the inaugural class.

Selected publications

References

20th-century American mathematicians
21st-century American mathematicians
Number theorists
American women mathematicians
Living people
Year of birth missing (living people)
Fellows of the Association for Women in Mathematics
20th-century women mathematicians
21st-century women mathematicians
20th-century American women
Massachusetts Institute of Technology School of Science faculty
University of California, Berkeley alumni
Bryn Mawr College faculty
21st-century American women